Robert King, 2nd Earl of Kingston (1754 – 17 April 1799) was an Anglo-Irish peer. He was styled Viscount Kingsborough between 1768 and 1797.

Biography
He was the eldest surviving son of Edward King, 1st Earl of Kingston and Jane Caulfeild. From 1767 to 1768 he was educated at Eton College. He sat in the Irish House of Commons as the Member of Parliament for Boyle from 1776 to 1783, and for Cork County between 1783 and 1797, and served as a Governor of County Cork in 1789. In 1797 he succeeded to his father's titles and assumed his seat in the Irish House of Lords. Between 1797 and his death he was Custos Rotulorum of Roscommon.

On 18 May 1798, he was tried by his peers in the Irish House of Lords after allegedly murdering his brother-in-law Colonel Henry Gerald FitzGerald. FitzGerald was a married man who eloped with King's daughter Mary Elizabeth. With public sympathy on King's side and with considerable publicity, he was tried by his peers. He was acquitted as after three summonses no witnesses came forward. After a short conferee the Lords Temporal returned to the House of Commons and delivered the verdict 'not guilty'. The Lord Chancellor pronounced the verdict, broke his wand and dismissed the assembly.

Family

He married Caroline FitzGerald, daughter of Richard FitzGerald and Margaret King, on 5 December 1769, from whom he later separated. Together they had nine children: 
Hon. John King (died young)
Hon. Mary King (died young) 
George King, Viscount Kingsborough (28 April 1771 – 18 October 1839), succeeded to his father's titles and married Lady Helena Moore, daughter of Stephen Moore, 1st Earl Mountcashell
Hon. Henry King (1772 – 26 November 1839), married Mary Hewitt
Hon. Edward King (1772 – 14 February 1848)
Lady Margaret King (1773 – 29 January 1835), married Stephen Moore, 2nd Earl Mountcashell 
Hon. Robert King (12 August 1773 – 20 November 1854), raised to the peerage as Viscount Lorton, married Lady Frances Parsons, daughter of Laurence Parsons, 1st Earl of Rosse
Hon. Richard FitzGerald King (8 April 1779 – 22 September 1856), married Williamina Ross
Lady Jane Diana King (1780 - 9 April 1838), married 1st Count Wintzingerode (1778-1856), foreign minister of the king of Württemberg; 2nd General John de Ricci.

A Naval Biographical Dictionary (1849) by William Richard O'Byrne states that Robert King had a sixth son, James William, who became a rear-admiral in 1846. He married Caroline Cleaver, daughter of the Archbishop of Dublin; one of their daughters was the prominent evangelist Catherine King Pennefather.

References

1754 births
1799 deaths
18th-century Anglo-Irish people
Irish MPs 1776–1783
Irish MPs 1783–1790
Irish MPs 1790–1797
Robert
Members of the Irish House of Lords
People educated at Eton College
Members of the Parliament of Ireland (pre-1801) for County Cork constituencies
Members of the Parliament of Ireland (pre-1801) for County Roscommon constituencies
Earls of Kingston